The 1958 National Football League draft had its first four rounds held on December 2, 1957, and its final twenty-six rounds on January 28, 1958. Both sessions were held at the Warwick Hotel in Philadelphia.

This was the 12th and final year in which the first overall pick was a "lottery bonus". The Chicago Cardinals were automatically awarded the pick because it was the only team left that had not won the draft lottery yet. The Cardinals used the first pick to select quarterback King Hill.

Player selections

Round one

Round two

Round three

Round four

Round five

Round six

Round seven

Round eight

Round nine

Round ten

Round eleven

Round twelve

Round thirteen

Round fourteen

Round fifteen

Round sixteen

Round seventeen

Round eighteen

Round nineteen

Round twenty

Round twenty-one

Round twenty-two

Round twenty-three

Round twenty-four

Round twenty-five

Round twenty-six

Round twenty-seven

Round twenty-eight

Round twenty-nine

Round thirty

Hall of Famers

 Jim Taylor, fullback from Louisiana State University taken 2nd round 15th overall by the Green Bay Packers.
Inducted: Professional Football Hall of Fame class of 1976.
 Ray Nitschke, linebacker from Illinois taken 3rd round 36th overall by the Green Bay Packers.
Inducted: Professional Football Hall of Fame class of 1978.
 Bobby Mitchell, halfback from the University of Illinois at Urbana–Champaign taken 7th round 84th overall by the Cleveland Browns.
Inducted: Professional Football Hall of Fame class of 1983.
 John Madden, offensive tackle from California Polytechnic State University taken 21st round 244th overall by the Philadelphia Eagles.
Inducted: Professional Football Hall of Fame class of 2006 as a coach.
 Jerry Kramer, guard from Idaho taken 4th round 39th overall by the Green Bay Packers.
Inducted: Professional Football Hall of Fame class of 2018.
 Alex Karras, defensive tackle from the University of Iowa taken 1st round 10th overall by the Detroit Lions.
Inducted: Professional Football Hall of Fame class of 2020.
 Chuck Howley guard from West Virginia University taken 1st round 7th overall by the Chicago Bears.
Inducted: Professional Football Hall of Fame class of 2023.

Notable undrafted players

References

External links
 NFL.com – 1958 Draft
 databaseFootball.com – 1958 Draft
 Pro Football Hall of Fame

National Football League Draft
Draft
NFL Draft
NFL Draft
1950s in Philadelphia
American football in Philadelphia
Events in Philadelphia
NFL Draft
NFL Draft